Bunwell is a parish (population 1024) situated in the county of Norfolk, England, approximately 7 miles south-east of Attleborough. The parish includes the hamlets of Bunwell Hill, Bunwell Street, Great Green, Little Green and Low Common.

Heritage
Bunwell's name derives from the Old English for a stream with an abundance of reeds.

Bunwell does not have an entry for the Domesday Book.

Governance
An electoral ward in the same name exists. This ward stretches south to Tibenham with a total population taken at the 2011 census of 2,737.

St. Michael's Church
Bunwell's Parish Church is of Norman origin and is dedicated to Saint Michael. The great east window dates back to Easter of 1914.

Places of Interest
Bunwell Primary School & Nursery is part of the Co-operative Education East Multi-Academy Trust and was rated as 'Good' by Ofsted in 2019.

Sport and Recreation
Bunwell Athletic Football Club play home games at the Bunwell Recreation Ground and compete in the Norwich and District Sunday League. The operations of the club were put in jeopardy in 2016 after an arson attack, yet the club was able to continue due to support from the local community and Norfolk FA.

A greyhound racing track was opened on the meadow just off the Turnpike road where hare coursing used to take place . The racing was independent and not affiliated to the National Greyhound Racing Club. Racing took place from 1935 to 1940 but the site closed during Second World War.

War Memorial
Bunwell's War Memorial takes the form of two wooden plaques located inside St. Michael's Church. It lists the following names for the First World War:
 Company-Sergeant-Major Frederick W. Barker MC (1872-1916), 9th Battalion, Royal Norfolk Regiment
 Lance-Corporal Frederick J. W. Line (d.1915), 5th Battalion, Essex Regiment
 Lance-Corporal Harry Revell (d.1917), 7th Battalion, Royal Norfolk Regiment
 Gunner Alec Gooch (1893-1917), 70th (Siege) Battery, Royal Garrison Artillery
 Private William Churchill (d.1918), 5th Battalion, Dorsetshire Regiment
 Private Alec Stimpson (1894-1917), 7th Battalion, Royal Irish Fusiliers
 Private Charles Breeze (1894-1916), 1st Battalion, King's Regiment (Liverpool)
 Private Benjamin N. Ager (1887-1917), 22nd Battalion, Manchester Regiment
 Jack Bush
 Wilfred Chapman
 John Clarke
 Edward Dixon
 Henry Kent
 William Kleburgh
 Albert Pearce
 Bert Sale
 Jack Smith
 Reggie Smith
 Arthur Ward

And, the following for the Second World War:
 Flight-Lieutenant Hubert B. Kelly (1913-1944), No. 254 Squadron RAF
 Warrant-Officer Burney E. R. Whitehouse (d.1944), No. 7 Squadron RAF
 Leading-Aircraftman Anthony W. Turner (1922-1944), Royal Air Force
 Sergeant William J. Randall (1920-1943), No. 428 Squadron RCAF
 Sergeant Roy C. Neilson (1925-1944), 2nd Wing, Glider Pilot Regiment
 Driver William G. Parry (1914-1944), 239th (General Transport) Company, Royal Army Service Corps
 Gunner Leonard E. Potter (1921-1944), 98th (Surrey and Sussex Yeomanry) Field Regiment
 Private Robert E. Rush (1909-1944), 2nd Battalion, West Yorkshire Regiment

Notable Residents
Several members of 'Mona Mcnee's Love Children' (a local band) were born in the village.

References

External links 

 Bunwell parish community website

Villages in Norfolk
Civil parishes in Norfolk